Frederick Malcolm Combellack (May 30, 1906 – February 27, 2002) was an American classicist. He was a professor of Greek literature at the University of Oregon. He was a Guggenheim Fellow in 1942. He served on the board of directors of the American Philological Association in 1962, and he became its president in 1968.

References

1906 births
2002 deaths
People from Placerville, California
Stanford University alumni
University of Oregon faculty
American classical scholars